In at the Deep End Records (IATDE), founded 2000, is an independent record label based on the outskirts of Nottingham, England. The label specialises in hardcore punk and heavy metal music genres.

History 
The label was founded in 2000 by people involved with the UKbase project (UK hardcore and punk website). IATDE's first release was Amped Up. It was a compilation record of the bands that featured on the UKbase website. The label's third release was a  Beecher record that saw some success.  Beecher, a five piece mathcore band from Manchester, later joined Earache Records.

IATDE has released debut albums for a number many UK hardcore and metal bands; including Gallows, Architects, Sylosis and from the USA Suicide Silence

Discography
 Various artists - Amped Up
 The Osterman Weekend - S/T EP
 November Coming Fire - 'Black Ballads' Album
 The Nothing - 'Coma Poems' Album
 Beecher - 'Resention Is A Big Word In A Small Town' EP
 Centurion - 'One Hundred' EP
 Shaped by Fate - 'The Unbeliever' Album
 Everything For Some - 'A Thought Refused' Album
 And None of Them Knew They were Robots - Liebestod EP
Gallows - 'Orchestra Of Wolves' Album (later reissued by Warner Brothers)
Sylosis - 'Casting Shadows' EP and 'The Supreme Oppressor' EP
Architects - 'Nightmares' Album (Licensed to *Distort Records in North America)
Suicide Silence - 'Suicide Silence' EP
The Defiled - '1888' EP
Send More Paramedics - 'The Hallowed & The Heathen' Album
Wounds - 'Die Young' Album
Feed The Rhino - 'Burning Sons' Album
Aurora - 'Easily Broken' EP
Departures - 'Teenage Haze' Album (Licensed to No Sleep Records in North America)
Bastions - 'Hospital Corners' (one of Kerrang!''''s top 100 albums of 2012)
Polar - Shadowed by Vultures (2014)"Review: Shadowed By Vultures – POLAR". Indulge-sound.com
Weathered Hands - Of All The People That I’ve Left, Each One Has Died Of Loneliness - EP and A Warm Life in the ColdPay No Respect - Hope for the Hopeless'' EP

Reception 
IATDE has been favorably reviewed by Kerrang Magazine, Metal Hammer Magazine, Terrorizer Magazine, Mass Movement Magazine, and Rockhound Magazine.

References

External links
Official website

British record labels
Companies based in Nottingham
Hardcore record labels
Heavy metal record labels